Portrait of Clare is a 1927 novel by the British writer Francis Brett Young. A commercial success, it also won the James Tait Black Memorial Prize.

Adaptation
In 1950 it was made into a film directed by Lance Comfort and starring Margaret Johnston, Richard Todd and Ronald Howard.

References

Bibliography
 Cannadine, David. This Little World: The Value of the Novels of Francis Brett Young as a Guide to the State of Midland Society, 1870-1925. Worcestershire Historical Society, 1982.
 Goble, Alan. The Complete Index to Literary Sources in Film. Walter de Gruyter, 1999.

External links
 Full text of Portrait of Clare at HathiTrust Digital Library

1927 British novels
Novels by Francis Brett Young
British novels adapted into films